Felipe Sancery (born 27 May 1994) is a Brazilian rugby union player. He made his debut for  against  at the 2016 Americas Rugby Championship. His twin is also a Brazilian international, Daniel Sancery. They were both named in Brazil's men's sevens team for the 2016 Summer Olympics.

He was born in Brazil to a French father and a Brazilian mother.

References

External links 
 
 2016 Summer Olympics Profile

1994 births
Living people
Brazilian rugby union players
Brazilian people of French descent
Olympic rugby sevens players of Brazil
Brazil international rugby sevens players
Rugby sevens players at the 2016 Summer Olympics
Rugby sevens players at the 2019 Pan American Games
Pan American Games competitors for Brazil
Cobras Brasil XV players
Rugby union centres
Rugby union wings
Brazilian rugby sevens players
Sportspeople from Campinas
Twin sportspeople
Brazilian twins
Brazil international rugby union players